The following is a list of the 21 cantons of the Essonne department, in France, following the French canton reorganisation which came into effect in March 2015:

 Arpajon
 Athis-Mons
 Brétigny-sur-Orge
 Corbeil-Essonnes
 Dourdan
 Draveil
 Épinay-sous-Sénart
 Étampes
 Évry-Courcouronnes
 Gif-sur-Yvette
 Longjumeau
 Massy
 Mennecy
 Palaiseau
 Ris-Orangis
 Sainte-Geneviève-des-Bois
 Savigny-sur-Orge
 Les Ulis
 Vigneux-sur-Seine
 Viry-Châtillon
 Yerres

References